Haunted is a trade paperback collecting comic stories based on the Buffy the Vampire Slayer television series. The story features the first appearance of Faith in Buffy comics (she later appears in Note from the Underground and No Future for You.)

Story description

General synopsis

Faith tells Angel a story that takes place immediately after she was put into a coma. It seems the ghost of Sunnydale's former Mayor, Richard Wilkins, wants revenge against Buffy. Buffy must now cope with guilt over stabbing Faith and a poltergeist following her every movement.

Haunted #1

Takes place a few days after "Graduation Day, Part Two" and Double Cross. Angel has already left, and now two more of the gang are preparing to leave. Cordelia is going to become an actress while Xander intends to travel far and wide.

Haunted #2

Despite her comatose status, Faith once again becomes involved in Buffy's life. Meanwhile, vampires are surprising Buffy. One such incident leaves Rupert Giles out of action with a bad head injury.

Haunted #3

The recently killed Mayor of Sunnydale plans his strike against Buffy. Wilkins formalizes his plans to hit back at Buffy while tormenting her with dreams. There is also something weird happening beneath the University campus in Sunnydale, something Wilkins will not like.

Haunted #4

Wilkins takes possession of a powerful body and tries to destroy Buffy. He discovers this body in the Initiative basement. Xander leaves while Willow thinks about college life. Buffy must face Wilkins without knowing what or who he is, and must try to figure out Faith's message: "You're already dead."

Continuity

This comic takes place in the summer of 1999 (between Buffy seasons 3 and 4). The prologue, which appeared on the internet and in the TPB collection but not in the pages of the comics themselves, is supposed to be set concurrent with early Angel season 2.
It also shows the origins of season four's villain Adam and how he came to be.

Canonical issues

Buffy comics such as this one are not usually considered by fans as canonical. Some fans consider them stories from the imaginations of authors and artists, while other fans consider them as taking place in an alternative fictional reality. However unlike fan fiction, overviews summarising their story, written early in the writing process, were 'approved' by both Fox and Joss Whedon (or his office), and the books were therefore later published as officially Buffy merchandise. Some fans would argue that this comic is canon, because it was written by Jane Espenson, one of the main writers of the Buffy television series for five of its seven seasons (including the ones covered by this story), as well as a run on the canonical Buffy "Season 8" comic.

References

Comics based on Buffy the Vampire Slayer
Ghosts in written fiction
Prequel comics